The Bristol Royal Infirmary, also known as the BRI, is a large teaching hospital in the centre of Bristol, England. It has links with the nearby University of Bristol and the Faculty of Health and Social Care at the University of the West of England, also in Bristol.

The BRI is one of nine hospitals operated by the University Hospitals Bristol and Weston NHS Foundation Trust. It is on the same site as the Bristol Royal Hospital for Children, Bristol Haematology and Oncology Centre, and Bristol Heart Institute (BHI). The Bristol Haematology and Oncology Centre has 49 beds and the Bristol Heart Institute has 107, which are not included in the main hospital's total.

History

Early history 

The Bristol Royal Infirmary was founded by public subscription in 1735, making it one of the oldest infirmaries in the United Kingdom.

In 1904, Sir George White, who gave Bristol its first electric tramway service and established what was to become the Bristol Aeroplane Company, saved the hospital from debts of over £15,000 by increasing the number of subscribed donors and planning a fundraising carnival at Bristol Zoo. White was appointed president of the hospital in 1906. Recognising the need to modernise the hospital building to keep up with innovations in science and medicine, he established a £50,000 fund for a new hospital building. This led to the construction of the Edward VII Memorial Wing which was designed by Charles Holden and completed in 1912. During the First World War, the Memorial Wing at Bristol Royal Infirmary together with Southmead Hospital were requisitioned by the War Office to create the 2nd Southern General Hospital, a facility for the Royal Army Medical Corps to treat military casualties.

Post-war development 
Geoffrey Tovey, serologist and founder of the UK Transplant Service, worked at the hospital shortly before the Second World War. The hospital became part of the National Health Service in 1948 and was greatly extended in the 1960s. The Queen's Building extension opened in 1972, the Bristol Haematology and Oncology Centre, located behind the main hospital building, opened in 1971 and the adjacent Bristol Heart Institute opened in 2009.

Bristol heart scandal 
The Bristol heart scandal, which resulted in the deaths of a number of babies and young children during heart surgery (1984–1995) led to the Kennedy Report into paediatric cardiac surgical services at the hospital. The report, which was published in 2001, led to greater emphasis on clinical governance within the NHS and the publication of the performance ratings of individual heart surgeons.

Redevelopment 
In April 2011, the trust board approved an £80 million redevelopment of the hospital, consisting of a new ward block on Terrell Street behind the hospital, the refurbishment of the Queen's building, the conversion of wards in the King Edward building and the decommissioning of the Old Building. In September 2011, it was announced that Laing O'Rourke had signed a contract to redevelop the hospital and build an extension to the Bristol Royal Hospital for Children.

The redevelopment project included purpose-built medical and elderly care admissions units, a state-of-the-art intensive care unit, a surgical floor and a helipad on the roof of the Queen's Building.

The redevelopment also included building a new Welcome Centre at the main entrance of the hospital and a new facade for the Queen's building, once voted one of the ugliest buildings in Bristol, designed by the Spanish firm Nieto Sobejano Arquitectos. Construction began on the new hospital ward block in March 2011, with the demolition of buildings on Terrell Street. The newly completed Welcome Centre was opened to the public in December 2013. In May 2014, the helipad became fully operational and started receiving air ambulances from Bristol and the surrounding area, speeding up transfer times for patients who were being airlifted to the hospital. The HELP Appeal supported the construction of the helipad with a grant of £500,000.

Notable staff 
 Anna Beatrix Ballie (18641958), Matron 18981923, also Principal Matron Territorial Force Nursing Service 2nd Southern General Hospital (BRI and Southmead Hospitals), 19141919. Baillie trained at The London Hospital under Eva Luckes in 1888. Baillie became one of the first supporters and promoters of the College of Nursing (now RCN).  Baillie was noted as an 'inspiring manager' who established a well respected training school for nurses.

Archives
The archives of the Bristol Royal Infirmary are held at Bristol Archives (Ref. 35893) (online catalogue). The School of Nursing (Ref. 38973) (online catalogue, online catalogue), records of surgery and the dispensary (Ref. 38990) (online catalogue) and records relating to the 1991 inquiry into children's heart surgery at the infirmary (Ref. 45591) (online catalogue) are also held at Bristol Archives, as well as photographs (Ref. 40660) (online catalogue). A substantial quantity of material about the history of the infirmary can be found in papers collected by the surgeon Richard Smith (Ref. 35893/36) (online catalogue) and (Ref. 14754) (online catalogue).

Hospital charity 
Bristol & Weston Hospitals Charity (BWHC) raises money for all ten hospitals in the trust, to provide equipment, ward refurbishments and additional extras. It was formerly known as Above & Beyond and has existed since 1974. In 2013, the charity's Golden Gift Appeal raised £6million. For the year to March 2022, the charity's income was £2.64million.

In popular culture
Holby City Hospital, in the fictional city of Holby, which appears in the BBC medical dramas Casualty and Holby City, is based on the BRI.

See also
Healthcare in Bristol
Southmead Hospital

References

Sources

External links

 

University Hospitals Bristol and Weston NHS Foundation Trust
NHS hospitals in England
Teaching hospitals in England
Hospitals in Bristol
1735 establishments in England
Hospitals established in the 1730s
Buildings by Nieto Sobejano Arquitectos
Bristol Royal Infirmary King Edward VII Memorial Wing
Physicians of the Bristol Royal Infirmary